Dorcadion suturale is a species of beetle in the family Cerambycidae. It was described by Chevrolat in 1862. It is known from Spain.

Varietas
 Dorcadion suturale var. insuturale Pic, 1898
 Dorcadion suturale var. rufescentimembre Pic, 1947
 Dorcadion suturale var. schaufussi Pic, 1947

See also 
Dorcadion

References

suturale
Beetles described in 1862